The 2019 Brisbane International was a tournament on the 2019 ATP Tour and 2019 WTA Tour. It was played on outdoor hard courts in Brisbane, Queensland, Australia. It was the eleventh edition of the tournament and took place at the Queensland Tennis Centre in Tennyson. It was held from 30 December 2018 to 6 January 2019 as part of the Australian Open Series in preparation for the first Grand Slam of the year.

Points and prize money

Point distribution

Prize money 

1Qualifiers prize money is also the Round of 32 prize money.
*per team

ATP singles main-draw entrants

Seeds 

 1 Rankings are as of 24 December 2018.

Other entrants 
The following players received wildcards into the singles main draw:
  Alex Bolt
  James Duckworth
  Alexei Popyrin

The following players received entry into the singles main draw using a protected ranking:
  Andy Murray
  Jo-Wilfried Tsonga

The following players received entry from the qualifying draw:
  Ugo Humbert 
  Miomir Kecmanović
  Thanasi Kokkinakis
  Yasutaka Uchiyama

The following player received entry by a lucky loser:
  Taro Daniel

Withdrawals 
Before the tournament
  Rafael Nadal → replaced by  Taro Daniel
  Mischa Zverev → replaced by  Yoshihito Nishioka

ATP doubles main-draw entrants

Seeds 

 1 Rankings are as of 24 December 2018.

Other entrants 
The following pairs received wildcards into the doubles main draw:
  James Duckworth /  Jordan Thompson
  Alex de Minaur /  Lleyton Hewitt

WTA singles main-draw entrants

Seeds 

 1 Rankings are as of 24 December 2018.

Other entrants 
The following players received wildcards into the singles main draw:
  Kimberly Birrell
  Priscilla Hon
  Samantha Stosur

The following players received entry from the qualifying draw:
  Destanee Aiava 
  Marie Bouzková 
  Harriet Dart
  Anastasia Potapova

Withdrawals
Before the tournament
  Camila Giorgi → replaced by  Ajla Tomljanović

WTA doubles main-draw entrants

Seeds 

 1 Rankings are as of 24 December 2018.

Other entrants 
The following pairs received wildcards into the doubles main draw:
  Daria Gavrilova /  Karolína Plíšková
  Elise Mertens /  Samantha Stosur
The following pairs received entry as alternates:
  Olga Danilović /  Anastasia Potapova

Withdrawals
Before the tournament
  Daria Gavrilova (right shoulder injury)

Champions

Men's singles 

  Kei Nishikori def.  Daniil Medvedev, 6–4, 3–6, 6–2

Women's singles 

  Karolína Plíšková def.  Lesia Tsurenko, 4–6, 7–5, 6–2

Men's doubles 

  Marcus Daniell /  Wesley Koolhof def.  Rajeev Ram /  Joe Salisbury, 6–4, 7–6(8–6)

Women's doubles 

  Nicole Melichar /  Květa Peschke def.  Chan Hao-ching /  Latisha Chan, 6–1, 6–1

References

External links 
 

 
2019 ATP Tour
2019 WTA Tour
2019 in Australian tennis
2019
December 2018 sports events in Australia
January 2019 sports events in Australia